Johnny Tauer is an American psychologist, professor and basketball coach. He is the current head coach of the St. Thomas Tommies men's basketball team.

Playing career
Tauer played collegiately under Steve Fritz at St. Thomas, where he was an all-MIAC selection his senior year, and part of the Tommies 1994 NCAA Division III Final Four team. He ranks 14th in school history in scoring, 15th in rebounding and is sixth all time in MIAC history in three-point baskets.

Coaching career
After earning his doctorate in social psychology the University of Wisconsin–Madison, Tauer returned to St. Thomas as a professor and assistant men's basketball coach under Fritz. Upon Fritz's retirement in 2011 after the Tommies' 2011 NCAA Division III men's basketball tournament title win, Tauer was elevated to head coach on an interim basis before earning the job permanently.

As a member of the Tommies staff as an assistant or head coach, Tauer has guided the team to 12-straight MIAC championships from 2005 to 2017, and won a share of 14 of the last 15 MIAC regular season titles along with 14 NCAA tournament appearances, including a national title in 2016. Tauer will lead the Tommies into the Division I ranks as St. Thomas joins the Summit League for the 2021–22 season.

Personal life
Tauer is a tenured professor of psychology at St. Thomas.

Head coaching record

†Although they were atop the MIAC standings at the time the 2020–21 season was cut short due to the COVID-19 pandemic, the MIAC is not officially recognizing a regular season champion.

References

Living people
American men's basketball coaches
St. Thomas (Minnesota) Tommies men's basketball players
St. Thomas (Minnesota) Tommies men's basketball coaches
University of St. Thomas (Minnesota) faculty
21st-century American psychologists
Year of birth missing (living people)